Symphyotrichinae is a subtribe of plants in the family Asteraceae containing six genera primarily of North American origin. In addition to Symphyotrichum, the largest and the type genus, the genera are Almutaster, Ampelaster, Canadanthus, Psilactis, and Sanrobertia.

Classification
The following is a cladogram of the genera of subtribe Symphyotrichinae.

Citations

References

Taxa named by Guy L. Nesom
Astereae
Plant subtribes